Aventura en Río (Adventure in Rio) is a Mexican drama film directed by Alberto Gout. It was released in 1953 and starring Ninón Sevilla and Víctor Junco.

Plot
Victim of amnesia, Alicia (Ninón Sevilla) a Mexican woman is forced by an operator to work as a cabaret dancer in Rio de Janeiro. Far from her home in Mexico, her husband and her daughter, the woman lives several adventures and offers a distinct variant of her personality: violent, seductive,  aggressive, able to face with courage the most fearsome villains.

Cast
 Ninón Sevilla ... Alicia / Nelly
 Víctor Junco ... Ignacio Pendas
 Luis Aldás ... Piraña
 Anita Blanch ... Julia Galván

Reviews
Last film of the Cuban-Mexican actress and rumbera Ninón Sevilla directed by Alberto Gout, in which the melodrama of cabaret of the Mexican film is set against the background the Brazilian exotic locations. Notable musical numbers, especially the dream in which the three suitors are disputed the love of the star. Ninon Sevilla travels to Brazil, where she was idolized. Her arrival in Rio de Janeiro was front page of every newspaper and her admirers were fed into care and riots in wherever she appeared. For this occasion, the actress learned Portuguese.

According counted Sevilla, when the team was shooting the film in Brazil, had problems with the reflectors. The actress personally appeared before the then President Getúlio Vargas to request his intervention. Such was the prestige of the star in that country, that the president received her in official uniform and facilitated all for the filming of the movie. The newspapers wrote: The Rumba went to Catete.

References

External links
 

1953 films
Mexican black-and-white films
Rumberas films
1950s Spanish-language films
Mexican drama films
1953 drama films
Films directed by Alberto Gout
1950s Mexican films